The War Room, is a five-track EP from Public Service Broadcasting.

The EP is dedicated to J. Willgoose, Esq's great-uncle George Willgoose who died at Dunkirk.

Track listing

Personnel
 J. Willgoose, Esq. - Banjo, Electronics, Guitar, Sampling
 Stephen Hackshaw - Strings
 Wrigglesworth - Drums, Electronics, Piano
 Barry Gardner - Mastering
 Charlie Thomas - Drum Engineering

Samples 
The first four tracks on the EP featured each use samples from a different British World War II propaganda film these were If War Should Come (1939), London Can Take It! (1940), The First of the Few (1942) and Dig for Victory (1941).

Cover artwork 
The front cover of the EP used a photograph of the bomb-damaged library in Holland House in Kensington, London. A copy is held by the Historic England Archive who record that it was taken on 23 October 1940 and attribute it to Mr. Harrison of Fox Photos.

References

External links 

 The War Room at Discogs

2012 EPs
Public Service Broadcasting (band) albums